Tang Qaleh (also Romanized as Tang Qal‘eh) is a village in Kuhdasht-e Jonubi Rural District, in the Central District of Kuhdasht County, Lorestan Province, Iran. During the 2006 census, its population was 70, in 11 families.

References 

Towns and villages in Kuhdasht County